The Amazing Spider-Man 2 (internationally titled The Amazing Spider-Man 2: Rise of Electro) is a 2014 American superhero film based on the Marvel Comics character Spider-Man. The film was directed by Marc Webb and produced by Avi Arad and Matt Tolmach. It is the fifth theatrical Spider-Man film produced by Columbia Pictures and Marvel Entertainment, the sequel to The Amazing Spider-Man (2012), and the final film in The Amazing Spider-Man series.  The studio hired James Vanderbilt to write the screenplay and Alex Kurtzman and Roberto Orci to rewrite it. The film stars Andrew Garfield as Peter Parker / Spider-Man, alongside Emma Stone, Jamie Foxx, Dane DeHaan, Campbell Scott, Embeth Davidtz, Colm Feore, Paul Giamatti, and Sally Field. In the film, Peter Parker tries to protect his girlfriend Gwen Stacy as he investigates his parents' death while also dealing with the supervillain Electro and the return of his best friend, Harry Osborn, who is dying from a deadly genetic disease.

Development of The Amazing Spider-Man 2 began after the success of The Amazing Spider-Man. DeHaan, Giamatti, Felicity Jones, and Chris Cooper were cast between December 2012 and February 2013. Filming took place in New York City from February to June 2013. The film was released in 2D, 3D, and IMAX 3D on May 2, 2014, in the United States with two international premieres being held between March 31 and April 10 of that year. It received mixed reviews from critics, who praised the chemistry between Stone and Garfield, action sequences, visual effects, and Hans Zimmer's musical score, but criticized the screenplay, tonal inconsistency, and overabundance of plotlines. Foxx's portrayal of Electro was met with mixed responses. It grossed $709 million worldwide, making it the ninth-highest-grossing film of 2014.

The Amazing Spider-Man series was originally intended to continue with at least two more sequels and several spin-offs, most notably films centered on Venom and the Sinister Six. Due to the deal with Disney and Sony, all subsequent installments were canceled. Both Garfield and Foxx reprised their roles in Spider-Man: No Way Home (2021), which followed the events of this film, and linked it to the Marvel Cinematic Universe using the concept of the multiverse.

Plot
Former Oscorp scientist and businessman Richard Parker records a video message to explain his disappearance. He and his wife Mary Parker try to flee aboard a private jet that is hijacked by an assassin. The jet crashes, killing the couple.

In the present day, two years after his battle with Dr. Curt Connors, Richard and Mary's son, Peter, continues to fight crime as Spider-Man and apprehends Russian criminal Aleksei Sytsevich. Due to Peter's reservations about his relationship with his girlfriend Gwen Stacy since making a vow to her late father to stay away from her, Gwen ends their relationship after their high school graduation. Peter's childhood friend, Harry Osborn, returns home to see his terminally sick father, Norman Osborn, CEO of Oscorp. He explains that his illness is genetic and Harry is at the age where it first develops. Norman dies, and Harry is appointed the new CEO.

While working in an Oscorp laboratory, mild-mannered electrical engineer Max Dillon accidentally shocks himself and falls into a tank of genetically-engineered electric eels. They attack him and he mutates into a living electric generator. Meanwhile, Gwen tells Peter that she may move to England if she earns a scholarship to Oxford University. Unaware of the extent of his power, Dillon wanders into Times Square, accidentally causes a power outage, and is stopped by Peter, as Spider-Man. Dillon is taken to the Ravencroft Institute, where he is studied by German scientist Dr. Ashley Kafka.

Meanwhile, the first symptoms of Harry's illness are showing, and he uses information Norman gave him to deduce that Spider-Man's blood could save him. He asks Peter, who has been selling photos of Spider-Man to the Daily Bugle, to aid him in finding Spider-Man. Peter is unsure of what effects the transfusion would have and wary of the possibility of Harry suffering a mutation similar to Dr. Connors. He later refuses Harry as Spider-Man, angering him. Oscorp vice president Donald Menken frames Harry for covering up Dillon's accident, removes him as CEO, and takes control of Oscorp. Harry proposes a deal with Dillon, who now calls himself "Electro", to get back inside the Oscorp building. Electro agrees and kills Dr. Kafka.

Upon getting back into Oscorp, Harry finds the venom from the now-destroyed genetically altered spiders. However, after he forces Menken to inject him with the venom, it accelerates his illness and turns him into a goblin-like creature, but the built-in emergency protocol in an armored suit restores his health. Meanwhile, Peter finds his father's secret lab in an abandoned subway station and learns that he had to flee because he refused to cooperate with Norman's plans to make biogenetic weapons with his research. Peter then discovers that Gwen was offered the Oxford scholarship. He professes his love for her, and they agree to go to England together.

When Electro causes another power outage, Peter and Gwen restore power and overload Electro's body, killing him. Harry, as the Green Goblin, arrives equipped with Norman's weaponry. Upon seeing Gwen, he deduces Spider-Man's secret identity and swearing revenge for being refused the blood transfusion, takes her to the top of a large clock tower. Peter manages to subdue the Goblin but is unable to save Gwen, who falls to her death. Guilt-ridden and depressed, Peter ends his career as Spider-Man.

Five months later, Harry is coping with the aftereffects of his transformation while being imprisoned at Ravencroft. His associate, Gustav Fiers, visits him and the pair discusses forming their own team. Harry orders Fiers to start with Sytsevich, escaped from prison. Equipped with an electromechanical suit of armor, Sytsevich dubs himself the "Rhino" and rampages through the streets. Peter, inspired by Gwen's graduation speech, confronts him as Spider-Man.

Cast

 Andrew Garfield as Peter Parker / Spider-Man: An orphaned teenage boy who received spider-powers after being bitten by a genetically-altered spider. Peter first uses his powers to try to hunt down the killer of his uncle in The Amazing Spider-Man but soon decides to use his powers to fight crime as the vigilante known as Spider-Man. Garfield explained that the suit that he would wear in the film would undergo a new design. Garfield hoped to bring back the theme of him being an orphan stating, "I wanna keep exploring that theme of being fatherless, being motherless, searching for purpose and finding a purpose within himself". He felt that it was his responsibility to take on the role and that he does not take it lightly.
Max Charles as young Peter Parker.
 Emma Stone as Gwen Stacy:A high school student and Peter's love interest. When asked about Peter and Gwen's relationship in the sequel, Stone said, "She saves him more than he saves her. She's incredibly helpful to Spider-Man ... He's the muscle, she's the brains."
 Jamie Foxx as Max Dillon / Electro: An electrical engineer who works for Oscorp Industries and later transforms into a powerful, electrical creature following an accident, then taking the alias of "Electro". Foxx described the character as "a nobody" who initially idolizes Spider-Man. He develops an obsession with Spider-Man after being saved by him and obtains his powers through an accident at Oscorp involving electric eels. Foxx stated that the character would be redesigned to be more grounded and that the villain's classic yellow and green suit would be omitted in favor of a modern look, as depicted in the film.
 Dane DeHaan as Harry Osborn / Green Goblin: Peter's best friend for 10 years and son of Norman Osborn. He was sent away to boarding school around the same time Peter's parents disappeared and met him for the first time there. He eventually assumes the role of the Green Goblin after injecting a special serum of spider venom into his body, initially injected to provide a cure, which instead turns him into a hideous, psychotic, goblin-like creature. As the Green Goblin, Harry dons a technological suit capable of healing him and can fly with the use of a large glider.
 Campbell Scott as Richard Parker: Peter's deceased father.
 Embeth Davidtz as Mary Parker: Peter's deceased mother.
 Colm Feore as Donald Menken: Oscorp's Vice President and Head of the Board. He is often in dispute with Harry over his capabilities of being a CEO to Oscorp, claiming that because Harry is a boy, he is incapable of leading the company.
 Paul Giamatti as Aleksei Sytsevich / Rhino: A Russian gangster killer for the Russian Mafia who allies with Harry and receives a massive, well-armored, robot, rhino-like suit from him, deciding to call himself "the Rhino". Giamatti said of his character, "He's a Russian mobster. Russians are always good villains. I have an ability to just destroy things", he said. "My accent is pretty hammy. I loved doing it. It seemed to me like an opportunity to be as over-the-top hammy as possible. It was really fun."
 Sally Field as May Parker: Peter's aunt. Field was critical of the lack of depth in her role; during a 2016 appearance on The Howard Stern Show, she said that "It's really hard to find a three-dimensional character in [the film], and you work it as much as you can, but you can't put 10 pounds of shit in a five-pound bag."

Felicity Jones portrays Felicia Hardy, Harry's sidekick at Oscorp. While Jones was only credited as "Felicia" in the final film, her surname was presented as "Hardy" in a marketing video for the film's release on digital HD formats. Marton Csokas portrays Ashley Kafka, the head of Ravencroft Institute, and B. J. Novak appears as Alistair Smythe, Dillon's boss and an Oscorp employee. Kari Coleman, Charlie DePew, Skyler Gisondo, and Jacob Rodier reprise their roles from the first film as Helen Stacy, Philip Stacy, Howard Stacy, and Simon Stacy, respectively, with the latter being uncredited. Chris Cooper, who portrays Norman Osborn, the founder of Oscorp and Harry Osborn's father, and Denis Leary, who reprises his role as George Stacy, appearing as a soul in Peter's visions, are also in uncredited roles. Spider-Man cocreator Stan Lee has a cameo appearance as a guest at Peter and Gwen's graduation ceremony. Michael Massee reprises his role as the "Man in the Shadows" from the first film, with the character now credited as "Gustav Fiers (The Gentleman)". Shailene Woodley was cast as Mary Jane Watson before her scenes were cut from the final film. Aidy Bryant appears as a woman dressed as the Statue of Liberty.

Production

Development

In March 2011, James Vanderbilt was hired to write the sequel to The Amazing Spider-Man (2012), after scribing the predecessor, before Roberto Orci and Alex Kurtzman were hired to rewrite the first draft the following year, later joined by Jeff Pinkner; screenplay credit went to Kurtzman, Orci, and Pinkner, with screen story credit given to the trio and Vanderbilt. The sequel's villain was teased in the 2012 film. Webb stated that the origin story would further unfold in the second installment. In June 2012, Webb said he was unsure whether he would return, though it was confirmed on September 28, 2012, that he would return to direct the sequel. He stated that he "wanted to create a universe that not only can withstand but anticipate future storylines" while also "working in and of itself for one movie." Andrew Garfield had also expressed hope to reprise his role, and in September 2012, it was confirmed that he would do so. Emma Stone was later confirmed to be reprising her role as Gwen Stacy, having signed a contract for two Amazing Spider-Man sequels. The costume was completely redesigned to be more faithful to the comics, following the mixed reaction of the costume from the first film. The eye lenses were changed to be much larger and solid white, while specially screen printed fabrics were used to allow the color of the costume to change in different lighting scenarios. The web shooters were also modified to be more streamlined with the suit.

Actor J. K. Simmons expressed interest in reprising his role as J. Jonah Jameson from Sam Raimi's Spider-Man trilogy should the studio offer it to him. In October 2012, Electro was rumored as the next villain. Jamie Foxx was given the role. That December, Foxx confirmed that he was cast as the character, and during an interview with MTV, explained that the redesign of the character would be more grounded as well as details of his depiction, which were based upon the Ultimate Marvel incarnation of Electro. On December 3, 2012, Marc Webb revealed that Dane DeHaan was chosen to play Harry Osborn. Paul Giamatti was confirmed as a cast member in February 2013. Felicity Jones confirmed her involvement with the film under an undisclosed role. Giamatti also indicated in an October 2013 interview that he would return in The Amazing Spider-Man 3 as well. On February 27, 2013, Chris Cooper was cast as Norman Osborn.

By October 2012, Shailene Woodley was in talks for the role of Mary Jane Watson. By March 2013, Woodley had concluded filming her small role. Garfield recalled, "I think all of [those scenes] were in our backyards. We had two or three scenes with me talking over the fence, and there was one with us riding together on a motorcycle that we never got to shoot." By mid-June, Woodley's role was cut from the film, with director Webb explaining it as "a creative decision to streamline the story and focus on Peter and Gwen and their relationship."

Filming

On February 4, 2013, Marc Webb posted on Twitter that principal photography had begun and that the sequel was being shot on 35mm film in the anamorphic format, instead of being filmed digitally as the preceding film was. Sony revealed this would be the first Spider-Man film to be filmed entirely in New York state, including a car-chase scene that was filmed in Rochester because the speed laws are less restrictive in upstate New York.
It became the largest film production ever in New York state. The decision to film in Williamsburg, Brooklyn near the Passover holiday caused some controversy, as critics believed that this was culturally insensitive, and would cause problems with parking. The filming company decided to work with the community and then agreed to adjust its production activities for Passover. The producers had assembled a 200-person crew for the 10-day shoot in Rochester, with a total number of 250 local crew members and 150 local extras. The prominent scenes were shot mostly on Main Street of Rochester and were digitally remastered to look like New York City.

On March 1, a scene within the movie was filmed in NYC Chinatown's Nom Wah Tea Parlor. Consequently, Doyers street was shut down for the day of filming, with the businesses on the street being compensated for the inconvenience.

On June 25, Webb posted on Twitter that filming was completed. Soundstage work was done at Grumman Studios and Gold Coast Studios, both in Bethpage, New York, and at the Marcy Armory in Brooklyn.

Visual effects 

Sony Pictures Imageworks designed the CGI special effects for the film. The digital composition of the film, including the scene where the battle of Spider-Man and Electro in Times Square, took one year to complete. The sets of Times Square were built in Gold Coast Studios with the green screens and most of the scenes were digitally re-designed by computer. The photography and VFX team took over 36,000 photos of the Times Square in order to re-create the location digitally. In addition, the animation team captured over 100 billboards during the photography process.

The film was post-converted from 2D to 3D, in part because the production team wanted to shoot 35mm film. Dan Mindel used Kodak Vision3 500T 5219 and 200T 5213, while the second unit shot day exteriors on Kodak Vision3 50D 5203. During the production, 20 layers of lightning CGI effects were applied to depict Electro. Jamie Foxx was photographed as Electro by the KNB EFX team and the skin colors used to show the moods of the character. A total number of 1,600 visual effects shots of the film was originally filmed in 2K resolution and then converted into 4K resolution with the help of color grading. To give the visual effects a realistic look, sound designers Addison Teague and Eric Norris and re-recording mixers Paul Massey and David Giammarco mixed the background music using Auro 11.1 cinema sound technology and the film's soundtrack was remixed using Dolby Atmos, Auro, and Dolby 5.1.

Post-production
The film was mixed in Dolby Atmos and Auro 11.1 in the converted William Holden Theater. The mix for both was completed by Paul Massey and David Giammarco.

A mid-credit teaser scene from X-Men: Days of Future Past was added to the film after its London premiere, due to an existing deal between Webb and 20th Century Fox, in which Fox allowed Webb to direct the film if Sony would promote the X-Men film for free. The scene, set during the Vietnam War, shows Mystique (Jennifer Lawrence), a rogue mutant, trying to infiltrate a military camp led by William Stryker (Josh Helman) in an attempt to recruit fellow mutants Havok (Lucas Till) and Toad (Evan Jonigkeit). The scene's inclusion sparked confusion among some viewers in the United Kingdom, who thought it meant an X-Men–Spider-Man crossover film was being planned, based on how Marvel Studios and Disney use codas within the Marvel Cinematic Universe to promote future films.

Music

Webb then hired Hans Zimmer to compose the music for the film. On October 25, 2013, Pharrell Williams revealed to Billboard that he would co-compose the score with Zimmer. Webb and Zimmer formed a supergroup with Williams, Johnny Marr, Mike Einziger and former Eurythmic, David A. Stewart, to create the music for the sequel. Eventually, Stewart did not participate in the film's music, and the supergroup, credited as The Magnificent Six, a reference to the Sinister Six, was composed of Williams, Marr, Einziger, Junkie XL, Steve Mazzaro and Andrew Kawczynski assisting Zimmer. The soundtrack for the film was released on April 18, 2014, by Columbia Records and Madison Gate Records. Hans Zimmer described his work for this film as different from previous works by him, thus revealing one of the themes for the film, which was first heard on the website.

On March 31, 2014, Alicia Keys and Kendrick Lamar recorded a song titled "It's On Again", which was uploaded to SoundCloud. Keys announced the song on Twitter and credited Zimmer and Williams, along with Lamar and herself for the song, indicating the song as a part of the film's soundtrack. Webb described the song as "upbeat and exciting".

Marketing
The release of the film in the United Kingdom was moved to April 16, 2014, two days ahead of its original April 18 date. Deadline reported that, in addition to the production budget, the film's marketing budget was $180–190 million.

On July 17, 2013, Sony released a clip from the film with the first released footage of Jamie Foxx as Electro to encourage attendance at the panel, at the San Diego Comic-Con International. At the panel they premiered a four-minute trailer, which was not publicly released but eventually leaked on the internet. Viral marketing for the film included a version of the Daily Bugle on the blogging service Tumblr, which included references to Kate Cushing, Detective Stan Carter, the "Big Man", Izzy Bunsen, Joy Mercado, Donald Menken, the Vulture, Hydro-Man, Spencer Smythe, Ned Leeds, Anne Weying, J. Jonah Jameson, Shocker, Alistair Smythe, Doctor Octopus, Eddie Brock, The Enforcers, and Puma. Marc Webb posted a photo on Twitter with a message written in Dwarven language revealing that the first trailer would debut prior to 3D screenings of The Hobbit: The Desolation of Smaug.

On December 8, 2013, it was announced that new footage from the film would be presented during New Year's Eve festivities at New York City's Times Square. The film was further promoted during the World Wide Fund for Nature (WWF) "Earth Hour" campaign. The cast was present at the launch of the 2014 event in Singapore. Disney Consumer Products announced a merchandise product line for the film at the American International Toy Fair on February 17, 2014.

In March 2014, Gameloft and Marvel announced the launch of a mobile game of the same name for smartphones and tablets. It was released on consoles afterward. Kellogg's released an application featuring the film. Evian served as a promotional partner of the film. On April 1, 2014, the brand released an advertisement "The Amazing Baby & Me 2" featuring Spider-Man and a baby version of him, as a follow-up to their original "Baby & Me" campaign. The film partnered with NBCUniversal for advertising. Spots for the film appeared on Bravo, E!, USA, Syfy, Telemundo, and mun2. A customized page was created on Fandango. In May 2014, Marvel announced that Spider-Man's costume from the film would be shown within Marvel: Avengers Alliance.

Home media
The Amazing Spider-Man 2 was released by Sony Pictures Home Entertainment for digital download on August 5, 2014 and was released on Blu-ray, Blu-ray 3D and DVD on August 19, 2014. The Blu-ray/DVD release includes an alternate ending in which Peter Parker's father meets Peter at Gwen's resting place. Creative agency Deckhouse Digital was hired to produce several animated GIFs ahead of the film's Blu-ray/DVD release as part of a sponsored ad campaign on Tumblr.

The Amazing Spider-Man 2 received a standalone 4K UHD Blu-ray release on March 1, 2016. The film was later included in The Spider-Man Legacy Collection, a 4K UHD Blu-ray collection which includes the first five Spider-Man films, and was released on October 17, 2017.

Reception

Box office
The Amazing Spider-Man 2 grossed $202.9 million in the United States and Canada and $506.1 million in other countries for a worldwide gross of $709 million. Deadline Hollywood calculated the net profit of the film to be $70.38 million, when factoring together all expenses and revenues for the film, making it one of the top 20 most profitable releases of 2014.

The film grossed $8.7 million on its early Thursday night showings. It finished its opening weekend in first place with $91.6 million, almost $30 million more than the opening-weekend gross of the first film. Upon opening, The Amazing Spider-Man 2 had the second-highest domestic opening weekend for a 2014 film, behind Captain America: The Winter Soldier. In its second weekend the film grossed $35.5 million (falling 61%) and dropped to second at the box office behind newcomer Neighbors. It was similar to the 61.5% second-week drop of Spider-Man 3 (2007).

Outside North America, The Amazing Spider-Man 2 opened on April 16, 2014 to $2.73 million in the UK and to $190,000 in Belgium, while opening to $1.44 million in Australia and $1.11 million in Germany. Within a few days, the opening gross in the UK increased to $15 million, breaking The Lego Movies record for having the country's largest opening weekend of the year. Its final box office collection was $13.44 million there, one of the highest of all time by a Hollywood film. In China, the film played on 11,002 screens, which is the biggest release of any film in history. On its opening day in Hong Kong, the film earned $1.23 million, the highest opening gross in the territory.

Critical response
This is to date the only film featuring Spider-Man to receive a "Rotten" rating on the website. The site's critical consensus reads, "While the cast is outstanding and the special effects are top-notch, the latest installment of the Spidey saga suffers from an unfocused narrative and an overabundance of characters." On Metacritic, the film has a weighted average score of 53 out of 100 based on 50 critics, indicating "mixed or average reviews". Audiences polled by CinemaScore gave the film an average grade of "B+" on an A+ to F scale, lower than the "A−" earned by its predecessor.

The Los Angeles Times said, "[The film is] overstuffed with plot lines, set pieces and villains, although stars Andrew Garfield and Emma Stone do their best to give the movie heart." Tim Robey of The Telegraph said, "Marc Webb's Spider-Man sequel is overstuffed with high-voltage villains, but the sparks between Andrew Garfield and Emma Stone save the day". Simon Reynolds of Digital Spy said, "Peter's past, present and future all intertwine in a sequel that offers bang for your buck. That said you can't help [but] feel the franchise bean counters at work here thanks to all the ominous foreshadowing and unresolved character arcs. Too many cooks and all that ...". Kim Newman of Empire scored the film three out of five stars, saying: "A few too-broad gags aside—and even these are in the funky spirit of '60s Marvel—this is a satisfying second issue with thrills, heartbreak, gasps, and a perfectly judged slingshot ending." Leslie Felperin of The Hollywood Reporter said, "The eponymous hero hits his super-heroic stride here, as does Andrew Garfield in the role, especially when Spider-Man's alter ego Peter Parker learns there's always some fine print in a contract with this many benefits. The plot gets itself tangled up in multiple villain strands, but in the main, this installment is emotionally weightier and more satisfying than its predecessor."

Guy Lodge of Variety said, "Redundancy remains a problem, but this overlong superhero sequel gets by on sound, fury, and star chemistry." Richard Roeper gave the film a B+, stating that "It's about 20 minutes too long and it's overstuffed with too many characters and too many subplots, but there's enough good stuff in The Amazing Spider-Man 2 to warrant optimism about the next chapter of the franchise." A negative review came from Peter Travers of Rolling Stone, giving the film two stars out of four, he said: "Things go wrong quickly with Amazing 2. Am I the only one who hates the word Amazing to describe a movie that isn't? Just asking." IGN reviewer Daniel Krupa gave 6.9/10 and wrote, "Amazing Spider-Man 2 gets a lot right, yet there's a constant awkwardness to the machinery of its plot; you can almost hear the cogs turning. However, what's worse is that at times it becomes overtly patronising: there are flashing screens and computer voice-overs constantly telling you what something is or what something is doing, just in case the people in the back rows aren't paying attention, which feels at odds with the film's emotional intelligence." William Harrison of DVD Talk rated the film as 3.5 stars of 5 stars as "Recommended".

Accolades

Future

Cancelled sequels and spin-offs 
Sony had originally intended the film to launch an expansive film universe around Spider-Man to compete with the Marvel Cinematic Universe. In 2013, Sony announced a third Amazing Spider-Man film with a release date of June 10, 2016 with Alex Kurtzman, Roberto Orci, and Jeff Pinkner returning to write and a fourth film with a release date of May 4, 2018. The series was to include spin-off films featuring the Sinister Six and Venom, with Drew Goddard writing and directing the two-part Sinister Six and Kurtzman directing a Venom Carnage script co-written by himself, Orci, and Ed Solomon. Sinister Six Part 1 had been planned for a November 11, 2016 release. Additionally, by August 2014, Sony had hired Lisa Joy to write the script for a 2017 female-lead film featuring Felicia Hardy / Black Cat. Sony announced plans for a spin-off based on Spider-Man 2099 to be released in late 2017. The character later appeared in the post-credits scene of Spider-Man: Into the Spider-Verse (2018), voiced by Oscar Isaac.

However, between December 2013 and the release of The Amazing Spider-Man 2 in May 2014, Garfield and Webb stated that while they would both return for the third film, neither was certain of their involvement in the fourth with Webb confirming that he would not be directing. Following the mixed critical reviews and franchise-low box office performance of The Amazing Spider-Man 2, the future of the franchise was unclear. By July 2014, Orci had left the third film to work on Star Trek Beyond (2016). The Amazing Spider-Man 3, which would have included Chris Cooper returning as Norman Osborn and focused on Peter recovering from Gwen Stacy's death, was delayed to an unspecified date in 2018, and The Amazing Spider-Man 4 was moved to an unknown date.

Following the 2014 Sony Pictures hack, Emma Stone was revealed to be in talks to return as a resurrected Stacy in the 2017 female-lead film and The Amazing Spider-Man 4 as the antagonist Carnage. Sony was further revealed to be in talks to have Sam Raimi return to the franchise to direct a new trilogy for his version of the character along with a Spider-Man vs. The Amazing Spider-Man movie and was in discussion with Marvel Studios about including Spider-Man in the Marvel Cinematic Universe film Captain America: Civil War. Marvel reportedly was unhappy with some of the terms of the proposed arrangement including the film rights staying with Sony and both talks allegedly ceased. In early 2015, a deal between the studios that allows Spider-Man to be in the Marvel Cinematic Universe was reached, effectively cancelling The Amazing Spider-Man franchise. Speaking to Amy Adams for Variety's Actors on Actors YouTube series in 2016 Garfield described himself as being left "heartbroken" by his experience on working on The Amazing Spider-Man films.

Marvel Cinematic Universe 
The Marvel Studios and Sony Pictures co-production, Spider-Man: No Way Home, released in 2021. Being an adaptation of Marvel Comics' multiverse stories, it temporarily transported alternate reality versions of Spider-Men and other characters to the Marvel Cinematic Universe. This included characters from both movies in The Amazing Spider-Man duology, as well as the Spider-Man trilogy directed by Sam Raimi. Andrew Garfield and Tobey Maguire reprised their roles as Spider-Man. No Way Home also included a roster of villains from earlier Spider-Man films; Jamie Foxx returned as Max Dillon as portrayed in this movie (although he looks more yellow instead of blue, and his outfit at the final battle resembles more closely that of the comics), along with Willem Dafoe and Alfred Molina reprising their versions of Norman Osborn and Otto Octavius from Sam Raimi's trilogy. In limited roles involving voice acting and use of archival footage, Rhys Ifans reprised his role as Curt Connors from The Amazing Spider-Man and Thomas Haden Church returned as Flint Marko.

Following the events of The Amazing Spider-Man 2, No Way Home depicts Andrew Garfield's Peter Parker as being haunted by his inability to save Gwen Stacy from her fall and ends up saving Michelle Jones-Watson from a similar fate in that movie's climax.

See also
 List of films featuring powered exoskeletons

Notes

References

Further reading

External links

 
 
 

2014 films
2014 3D films
2010s English-language films
2014 science fiction films
2014 science fiction action films
2010s superhero films
2010s American films
American 3D films
American science fiction action films
American sequel films
Biopunk films
Columbia Pictures films
Fictional portrayals of the New York City Police Department
Films about the New York City Police Department
Films scored by Mike Einziger
Films scored by Junkie XL
Films scored by Johnny Marr
Films scored by Pharrell Williams
Films scored by Hans Zimmer
Films about genetic engineering
American films about revenge
Films directed by Marc Webb
Films produced by Avi Arad
Films produced by Matt Tolmach
Films set in New York City
Films shot in New York (state)
Films shot in New York City
Films set in 2014
Films using motion capture
IMAX films
Films with screenplays by Alex Kurtzman and Roberto Orci
Spider-Man films
The Amazing Spider-Man (2012 film series)
Teen superhero films
Green Goblin
Live-action films based on Marvel Comics